The West River is a river in the U.S. state of Rhode Island. It has a history of providing water to textile mills during the Industrial Revolution as evidenced by the 7 dams along the river's length.

Course
The West River rises on the town line between Lincoln and Smithfield from a few small streams that originate in the vicinity of Lantern Road. The West River then flows southward, past Twin River Road and into Wenscott Reservoir.  Below the reservoir, the river meanders east-southeast through North Providence and into Providence where it flows into the Moshassuck River north of downtown.

Crossings
Below is a list of all crossings over the West River. The list starts at the headwaters and goes downstream.

Smithfield
Whipple Road
Crosses two of the primary streams that converge south of here to form the main West River.
Twin River Road
North Providence
Asylum Road
Douglas Terrace
Brookfarm Road
West River Parkway
Mineral Spring Avenue (RI 15)
Providence
Douglas Avenue (RI 7) (Twice)
Veazie Street
Branch Avenue
Rhode Island State Route 146
Hawkins Street
Charles Street
West River Street
Interstate 95

Tributaries
Angell Brook is the West River's only named tributary, though it has many unnamed streams that also feed it.

See also
List of rivers in Rhode Island
Moshassuck River

References
Maps from the United States Geological Survey

Rivers of Providence County, Rhode Island
Geography of Providence, Rhode Island
Rivers of Rhode Island
Tributaries of Providence River